Ülo Tärno (born 22 May 1936 in Haapsalu) is an Estonian politician. He was a member of IX Riigikogu.

He has been a member of Estonian Centre Party.

References

Living people
1936 births
Members of the Riigikogu, 1999–2003
People from Haapsalu
Estonian Centre Party politicians